The FIATA International Federation of Freight Forwarders Associations is a non-governmental organization representing freight forwarders worldwide. According to the FIATA Annual Report 2021, FIATA counted 109 Associations Members representing the freight forwarding industry within a territory and 5959 Individual members, representing freight forwarding and logistics companies.

History and organization
FIATA was founded in Vienna, Austria, on 1926 and owes its name to its acronym . Also known as the ‘Architects of Transport’, FIATA has Association Members and Individual Members in some 150 countries.

FIATA has consultative status with the United Nations Economic and Social Council (inter alia ECE, ESCAP, ESCWA), the United Nations Conference on Trade and Development, and the UN Commission on International Trade Law. FIATA is recognized as representing the freight forwarding industry by many other governmental organizations, governmental authorities, and private international organizations in the field of transport such as the International Chamber of Commerce, the International Air Transport Association, the International Union of Railways, the International Road Transport Union, the World Customs Organization, the World Trade Organization, etc.

FIATA is headquartered in Geneva, Switzerland.

Documents
FIATA has created several documents and forms to establish a uniform standard for use by freight forwarders worldwide. The documents are easily distinguishable as each has a distinctive colour and carries the FIATA logo which can be seen at the head of this page.

 FCR: Forwarders Certificate of Receipt
 FCT: Forwarders Certificate of Transport
 FWR: FIATA Warehouse Receipt
 FBL: FIATA Bill of Lading (negotiable Multimodal Transport)
 FWB: FIATA Waybill (non-negotiable Multimodal Transport)
 SDT: Shippers Declaration for the Transport (of Dangerous Goods)
 SIC: Shippers Intermodal Weight Certificate
 FFI: FIATA Forwarding Instructions

See also

 Freight forwarder
 Logistics
 Trade facilitation

References

External links
 , official website

1920s establishments in Austria
Canton of Geneva
International business organizations
International transport organizations
Freight forwarders associations
International organisations based in Switzerland
Organizations established in 1926